Statistics of American Soccer League II in season 1950–51.

League standings

References

American Soccer League (1933–1983) seasons
Amer